Dandalup River is one of the shortest rivers in Western Australia. It begins at the confluence of the South Dandalup River and the North Dandalup River north of Pinjarra, and flows for  before emptying into the Murray River.

References

 

Rivers of the Peel region